Jean C. Baudet is a Belgian philosopher and writer, born in Brussels (May 31, 1944) and dead in Laeken (July 18, 2021).

Life
J.C. Baudet taught philosophy and history of science, from 1966 to 1973, in Africa (Congo, Burundi).
From 1973 to 1978, he was a biology researcher (agronomy faculty of Gembloux, Belgium, and Université de Paris-VI). 
In 1978, he was the founder of the periodical Technologia (history of Science-Technics-Industry).
Since 1996, he was an editor of the Revue Générale (Bruxelles). The philosophical system developed by J.C. Baudet is known as editology.

Science-Technics-Industry
Science-Technics-Industry (STI) is a philosophical concept proposed by the Belgian philosopher Jean C. Baudet.  The objective of STI is to distinguish the rational cultural productions from the emotional or imaginary ones.  Emotional and imaginary cultural productions lead to ideologies and/or ethical and politically illusive constructions. STI is a key-concept in editology. It may be seen as an elaborate philosophical generalization of the economical notion of science and industry. In the STI, technics are the interface between science and industry, and thus between knowledge (truth) and practice (efficiency).

Editology
Editology (in French: éditologie) is the epistemological system developed by Baudet. The main characteristic of the editology is to define the knowledge as a set of texts, discourses (and thus terms), and to assign the scientificity of those texts to the very conditions of their edition - the manner they are accepted by the international scientific community. It has two purposes: understand the terms (terminology) and analyze the edition (editology sensu stricto).

This philosophical approach leads to a conception of the knowledge (an truth) which admits that the hard core of rationalism (logic) is the epistemological complex STI (Science-Technics-Industry). An important consequence of the editological thought is to establish an historical critic of the successive discourses which characterize the milestones of the human thinking: literature, religion, and later philosophy. In that sense, the philosophy is defined as a discourse rejecting all the discourses.

Bibliography

 Les céréales mineures, ACCT, Paris, 1981.
 Les ingénieurs belges, APPS, Brussels, 1986.
 Nouvel abrégé d'histoire des mathématiques, Vuibert, Paris, 2002.
 De l'outil à la machine, Vuibert, Paris, 2003.
 De la machine au système, Vuibert, Paris, 2004.
 Penser la matière. Une histoire de la chimie, Vuibert, Paris, 2004.
 Mathématique et vérité. Une philosophie du nombre, L'Harmattan, Paris, 2005.
 Le signe de l'humain. Une philosophie de la technique, L'Harmattan, Paris, 2005.
 Penser le vivant. Une histoire de la médecine et de la biologie, Vuibert, Paris, 2005.
 Une philosophie de la poésie. Entre poème et théorème, L'Harmattan, Paris, 2006.
 Penser le monde. Une histoire de la physique, Vuibert, Paris, 2006.
 La vie expliquée par la chimie, Vuibert, Paris, 2006.
 Histoire des sciences et de l'industrie en Belgique, Jourdan, Bruxelles, 2007.
 Expliquer l'Univers, Vuibert, Paris, 2008.
 A la découverte des éléments de la matière, Vuibert, Paris, 2009.
 Curieuses histoires de la science. Quand les chercheurs se trompent, Jourdan, Bruxelles, 2010.
 A quoi pensent les Belges, Jourdan, Bruxelles, 2010.
 Curieuses histoires des dames de la science, Jourdan, Bruxelles, 2010.
 Curieuses histoires de la pensée, Jourdan, Bruxelles, 2011.
 Curieuses histoires des inventions, Jourdan, Bruxelles, 2011.
 Curieuses histoires des entreprises, Jourdan, Brussels, 2012.
 Histoire de la pensée de l'an Un à l'an Mil, Jourdan, Brussels, 2013.
 La vie des grands philosophes, Jourdan, Brussels, 2013.
 Histoire de la cuisine. Une philosophie du goût, Jourdan, Brussels, 2013.
 Les agitateurs d'idées en France, La Boîte à Pandore, Brussels, 2014.
 Histoire des mathématiques, Vuibert, Paris, 2014.
 Les plus grands Belges, La Boîte à Pandore, Paris, 2014.
 Les plus grands ingénieurs beges, La Boîte à Pandore, Paris, 2014.
 Histoire de la physique, Vuibert, Paris, 2015.

References

External links
 "Jean C. Baudet", Editions L'Harmattan

20th-century Belgian philosophers
1944 births
Living people